The 2000–01 Honduran Liga Nacional was the 36th season in the history of the Honduran top division; this was the third tournament under the Apertura and Clausura format; C.D. Olimpia managed to beat C.D. Platense in the Apertura Final and obtained its 15th league title; in the Clausura C.D. Platense took revenge over C.D. Olimpia and won its 2nd title. The league games started 30 September 2000 and ended on 22 July 2001.

2000–01 teams

 Broncos (Choluteca)
 Deportes Savio (Santa Rosa de Copán) (promoted)
 Marathón (San Pedro Sula)
 Motagua (Tegucigalpa)
 Olimpia (Tegucigalpa)
 Platense (Puerto Cortés)
 Real España (San Pedro Sula)
 Universidad (Tegucigalpa)
 Victoria (La Ceiba)
 Vida (La Ceiba)

Apertura
The Apertura tournament was the first half of the 2000–01 season in the Honduran football; Club Deportivo Olimpia set a record of 10 wins in a row, the first nine composed a whole round-robin. In the Final match Olimpia conquered its 15th title after defeating C.D. Platense 2–1 on aggregated score.

Regular season

Standings

Results
 As of 13 January 2001

Final round

Hexagonal

Olimpia vs Vida

 Olimpia won 2–1 on aggregate score.

Motagua vs Universidad

 Universidad won 3–2 on aggregate score.

Platense vs Real España

 Platense 2–2 Real España; Platense advances on better Regular season performance. Real España advances as best losers.

Semifinals

Olimpia vs Real España

 Olimpia won 2–0 on aggregate score.

Platense vs Universidad

 Platense won 3–2 on aggregate score.

Final

Olimpia vs Platense

Top goalscorers
13 goals
  Marcelo Verón (Platense)
8 goals
  Denilson Costa (Olimpia)
6 goals

  José Pacini (Platense)
  Danilo Tosello (Olimpia)

1 goal
  Saúl Martínez (Olimpia)

Clausura
In the Clausura tournament of the 2000–01 season; C.D. Platense took revenge on C.D. Olimpia and achieved its second championship in its history. On the other hand, C.D. Broncos although they finished fifth in the Regular season, they were not allow to participate in the Hexagonal, due to their condition of relegated team; C.D. Motagua replaced them instead.

Regular season

Standings

Results
 As of 17 June 2001

Final round

Hexagonal

Olimpia vs Motagua

 Olimpia won 3–2 on aggregate score.

Platense vs Victoria

 Platense won 3–2 on aggregate score.

Marathón vs Real España

 Marathón 1–1 Real España on aggregate score; Marathón advanced on better Regular season performance; Real España advanced as best loser

Semifinals

Olimpia vs Real España

 Olimpia 1–1 Real España on aggregate score; Olimpia advanced on better Regular season record.

Platense vs Marathón

 Platense won 4–3 on aggregate score.

Final

Olimpia vs Platense

Top goalscorers
13 goals
  Pompilio Cacho (Marathón)
10 goals
  Marcelo Verón (Platense)
8 goals

  José Pacini (Platense)
  Saúl Martínez (Motagua)

7 goals
  Danilo Tosello (Olimpia)
5 goals
  Denilson Costa (Olimpia)
2 goals

  Julio de León (Olimpia)
  Narciso Fernández (Marathón)

Relegation
Relegation was determined by the aggregated table of both Apertura and Clausura tournaments.

Relegation playoff

 Deportes Savio won Relegation playoff 4–3 on penalty shootouts; Broncos were relegated to the 2001–02 Segunda División.

References

Liga Nacional de Fútbol Profesional de Honduras seasons
1
Honduras